Elimane Franck Kanouté (born 13 December 1998) is a Senegalese professional footballer who plays as a midfielder for  club Sochaux, on loan from Belgian First Division A club Cercle Brugge.

Club career
Kanouté made his Serie B debut for Pescara on 8 September 2017 in a game against Frosinone. On 1 August 2019, he joined Cosenza on loan until 30 June 2020.

On 1 September 2020, Kanouté joined Cercle Brugge. He signed a contract until 2024.

On 14 July 2022, Kanouté moved to Sochaux in France on loan.

International career
Kanouté debuted for the Senegal national team in a 1–0 2021 Africa Cup of Nations qualification win over Guinea Bissau on 15 November 2020.

References

External links
 

1998 births
Living people
Association football midfielders
Senegalese footballers
Senegal international footballers
Delfino Pescara 1936 players
Ascoli Calcio 1898 F.C. players
Cosenza Calcio players
Cercle Brugge K.S.V. players
FC Sochaux-Montbéliard players
Serie B players
Belgian Pro League players
Ligue 2 players
Senegalese expatriate footballers
Expatriate footballers in Italy
Senegalese expatriate sportspeople in Italy
Expatriate footballers in Belgium
Senegalese expatriate sportspeople in Belgium
Expatriate footballers in France
Senegalese expatriate sportspeople in France